Gustav-Adolf Mossa (28 January 1883 – 25 May 1971) was a French illustrator, playwright, essayist, curator and late Symbolist painter.

Early life 

Art and theatre work 

Mossa received his initial artistic training from his father before studying at the School of Decorative Arts in Nice until 1900, where he became acquainted with Art Nouveau and was later introduced to the Symbolist movement after visiting the Exposition Universelle in the same year.  Mossa was heavily inspired by the art of Symbolist painter Gustave Moreau and Symbolist writers, such as Charles Baudelaire, Stéphane Mallarmé, Jules Barbey d'Aurevilly and Joris-Karl Huysmans.

The main body of Mossa's public and private art work was created with water colours and strong ink lines, the subjects including caricatures, Carnival or medieval scenes, portraits and landscapes, with a fascination for the French Riveria in particular.  He also created wooden reliefs, designed theatre scenery, wrote literary essays and created book illustrations, including a large series of drawings for the work of Robert Schumann.

In 1902 he began collaborating with his father on the Nice Carnival project, designing floats and posters.  Both father and son are still celebrated for raising the Carnival's prestige, and the event continues to be a major, large scale tourism attraction in Nice.

Symbolist paintings

Mossa's decade long Symbolist period (1900-1911) was his most prolific and began as a reaction to the recent boom of socialite leisure activity on the French Rivera, his works comically satirising or condemning what was viewed as an increasingly materialistic society and the perceived danger of the emerging New Woman at the turn of the century, whom Mossa appears to consider perverse by nature.

His most common subjects were femme fatale figures, some from Biblical sources, such as modernised versions of Judith, Delilah and Salome, mythological creatures such as Harpies or more contemporary and urban figures, such as his towering and dominant bourgeoise woman in Woman of Fashion and Jockey. (1906)  His 1905 work Elle, the logo for the 2017 Geschlechterkampf exhibition on representations of gender in art, is an explicit example of Mossa's interpretation of malevolent female sexuality, with a nude giantess sitting atop a pile of bloodied corpses, a fanged cat sitting over her crotch, and wearing an elaborate headress inscribed with the Latin hoc volo, sic jubeo, sit pro ratione voluntas (What I want, I order, my will is reason enough).

Many aspects of Mossa's paintings of this period were also indictive of the decadent movement, with his references to Diabolism, depictions of lesbianism (such as his two paintings of Sappho), or an emphasis on violent, sadistic or morbid scenes.

Though these paintings are the subject of most present day exhibitions, scholarly articles and books on the artist, they were not released to the public until after Mossa's death in 1971.

In 1911, Mossa discovered Flemish Primitive and Gothic art while in Brugge and abandoned Symbolism.

Theatre

Mossa wrote several operas and plays, and contributed to a revival of dialectal theater with his first theatrical piece Lou Nouvé o sia lou pantai de Barb' Anto (1922), written in the Niçard dialect.  Following the play's success, Mossa established the Lou Teatre de Barba Martin group, who performed his comedies 'Phygaço' (1924), 'La Tina' (1926) and 'Lou Rei Carneval' (1935), until 1940.  His plays are still performed in Nice.

Gallery work and later life

After the death of his father, Alexis, Mossa took over the curation of the Nice Museum of Fine Arts in 1927 and would keep the position until his death in 1971.<ref>Rosemary o'Neill, "Art and Visual Culture on the French Riviera, 1956-971: The Ecole de Nice, 2012, p.31</ref>  Mossa would later bequeath most of his own artistic pieces to the gallery.

From the end of the Second World War, Mossa devoted himself to creating works about the City of Nice, illustrating official documents, drawing armorial bearings and traditional suits of the County, and producing several watercolours of the region's landscapes.

 Personal life 
In 1908 he married Charlotte-Andrée Naudin, whom he divorced in 1918.  He married again in 1925 to Lucrèce Roux, until her death in 1955.  He was married a final time in 1956 to Marie-Marcelle Butteli, until his death on 25 May 1971.

Exhibitions and  collections

Exhibitions
Permanent
The Musée-Galerie d' Alexis at Gustav Adolf Mossa is a museum dedicated to Mossa and his father in Nice
His works are part of The Fin-de-Siècle Museum section of the Royal Museums of Fine Arts of Belgium.

Solo
1909    Nice, L'Artistique, Exposition d'oeuvres d'Alexis et de Gustav Adolf Mossa1911    Paris, Galerie Georges Petit, Exposition d'oeuvres de G.A. Mossa1913    Nice, Musée Municipal, Exposition d'images sur l'oeuvre de Schumann par G.A. Mossa1913    Paris, Galeries George Petit, Exposition d'images de G.A. Mossa, inspirées par l 'oeuvre  de Schumann1974    Nice, Musée Jules Chéret, Alexis et Gustav Adolf Mossa, peintres niçois1978    Nice, Galeries des Ponchettes, Gustave Adolf Mossa et les symboles1989    Yokohama, Galerie Motomachi, Gustave Adolf Mossa1992    Paris, Pavillon des Arts, G. A.  Mossa: L'Oeuvre symboliste 1903-1918'2010    Belgium, Felicien Rops Museum, L'oeuvre Secrète de Gustav-Adolf MossaGroup
1976    Paris, Espace Pierre Cardin, Exposition Sarah Bernhardt1981    Chicago, The David & Alfred Smart Gallery, University of Chicago, The Earthly Chimera and the Femme Fatale: Fear of Women in 19th Century Art2008    Évian-les-Bains, Palais Lumière, Eros and Thanatos2015    Sacramento, Crocker Art Museum, Toulouse-Lautrec and La Vie Moderne: Paris 1880-19102015    Paris, Musée d'Orsay, Splendour and Misery. Pictures of Prostitution, 1850-19102017    Frankfurt, Städel-Museum, GeschlechterkampfFurther reading
Jean-Roger Soubiran, Gustav Adolf Mossa: 1883-1971, 1985,  & 
Sylvie Lafon, Gustav Adolf Mossa: La scène symboliste 1993  & 
Jean Forneris, Gustav Adolf Mossa 1994, 
Gl. Holtegaard, Gustav-Adolf Mossa 1903-1918: Symbolist Works, 1999,  & 
Felix Kramer, Battle of the Sexes: From Franz Von Stuck to Frida Kahlo, 2017,  & 
Leonardo de Arrizabalaga y Prado, Varian Studies Volume Three: A Varian Symposium, Article: Gustav Adolf Mossa (1883-1971), Lui, A Portrait of Varius'' by Caroline De Westenholz, 2017

See also
 Aubrey Beardsley
 Félicien Rops
 Fin-de-siecle
 Belle Époque

References

External links 
 Nice Rendezvous, Artist Profile
Invaluable, Artist Profile
Wiki Art Gallery
Art Nouveau Jugendstil
Fine Art, Artist Profile
Europe Cities, Artist Profile
Artnet, Artist profile

French male painters
French male non-fiction writers
French curators
20th-century French illustrators
1883 births
1971 deaths
20th-century French essayists
20th-century French painters
20th-century French male artists
French Symbolist painters
20th-century French dramatists and playwrights
People from Nice
20th-century French male writers